USS Lomado (SP-636) was a United States Navy patrol vessel in commission from 1917 to 1919.

Lomado was built as a private motor yacht of the same name by F. S. Nook at East Greenwich, Rhode Island, in 1916. On 18 May 1917, the U.S. Navy purchased her from Frederick T. Rogers of Providence, Rhode Island,  for use as a section patrol boat during World War I. Rogers delivered her to the Navy on 29 May 1917, and she was commissioned as USS Lomado (SP-636) on 1 June 1917. Lomado was enrolled in the Naval Coast Defense Reserve on 5 June 1917.

Assigned to the 2nd Naval District in southern New England, Lomado served as a section and shore patrol boat based at New Bedford, Massachusetts, for the rest of World War I. She patrolled the coast from Buzzards Bay in Massachusetts to Narragansett Bay in Rhode Island. She also trained men for duty in section patrol boats.

Lomado was sold to John J. Hanson of Jersey City, New Jersey, on 30 June 1919.

References

SP-636: Lomado at Department of the Navy Naval History and Heritage Command Online Library of Selected Images: U.S. Navy Ships -- Listed by Hull Number: "SP" #s and "ID" #s -- World War I Era Patrol Vessels and other Acquired Ships and Craft numbered from SP-600 through SP-699
NavSource Online: Section Patrol Craft Photo Archive Lomado (SP 636)

Patrol vessels of the United States Navy
World War I patrol vessels of the United States
Ships built in Providence, Rhode Island
1916 ships
Individual yachts